The term Modernism describes the modernist movement in the arts, its set of cultural tendencies and associated cultural movements, originally arising from wide-scale and far-reaching changes to Western society in the late 19th and early 20th centuries. In particular the development of modern industrial societies and the rapid growth of cities, followed then by the horror of World War I, were among the factors that shaped Modernism. 

This is a partial list of modernist women writers.
 Anna Akhmatova (1889–1966), Russian poet  
 Ingeborg Bachmann (1926–1973), Austrian poet and author
 Djuna Barnes (1892–1982), American novelist, playwright, etc.
 Kay Boyle (1902–1992), American novelist, poet, short story writer
 Bryher (1894–1983), British novelist, activist
 Mary Butts (1890–1937), British novelist
 Kate Chopin (1851–1904), American novelist, short story writer
 H.D. (1886–1961), American poet, novelist, memoirist
 Baroness Elsa von Freytag-Loringhoven (1874–1927), German-American poet
 Forough Farrokhzad (1935–1967), Iranian poet, film director
 Radclyffe Hall (1880–1943), British novelist, poet
 Lillian Hellman (1905–1984), American playwright, memoirist
 Ada Verdun Howell (1902–1981), Australian poet
 Zora Neale Hurston (1891–1960), American novelist
 Mary Hutchinson (1889–1977), British short story writer
 Else Lasker-Schüler (1869–1945), Jewish German poet
 Amy Lowell (1874–1925), American poet 
 Mina Loy (1882–1966), British poet 
 Edna St. Vincent Millay (1892–1950), American poet
 Hope Mirrlees (1887–1978), British poet
 Marianne Moore (1887–1972), American poet and essayist
 Adalgisa Nery (1905–1980), Brazilian poet and journalist
 Silvina Ocampo (1903–1994), Argentine poet, short-fiction writer
 Jean Rhys (1890–1979), Caribbean novelist
 Katherine Mansfield (1888–1923), New Zealand short story writer
 Dorothy Richardson (1873–1957), British novelist
 May Sinclair (1863–1946), British novelist and short story writer.
 Edith Sitwell (1887–1964), British poet and critic
 Gertrude Stein (1874–1946), American poet, playwright, essayist, etc.
 Edith Södergran (1892–1923) Swedish-speaking Finnish poet
 Edith Wharton (1862–1937), American novelist, short story writer
 Virginia Woolf (1882–1941), British novelist, essayist, short-fiction writer

See also
List of modernist writers
List of modernist poets
Modernist literature
 Women's writing (literary category)

Modernist